Macrosiagon pectinata is a species of wedge-shaped beetle in the family Ripiphoridae. It is found in Central America and North America.

References

Further reading

External links

 

Ripiphoridae
Articles created by Qbugbot
Beetles described in 1775
Taxa named by Johan Christian Fabricius